Megra Admassou (born 14 August 1935) is a former Ethiopian cyclist. He competed in the individual road race at the 1960 Summer Olympics.

References

External links
 

1935 births
Living people
Sportspeople from Southern Nations, Nationalities, and Peoples' Region
Ethiopian male cyclists
Olympic cyclists of Ethiopia
Cyclists at the 1960 Summer Olympics